Malcolm Cacutalua (born 15 November 1994) is a German professional footballer who plays as a defender for  club Magdeburg.

Club career
On 3 June 2022, Cacutalua signed with Magdeburg.

International career
Cacutalua was born in Germany and born to an Angolan father and German mother. He has been a German youth international.

Career statistics

References

External links
 

1994 births
Living people
People from Troisdorf
Sportspeople from Cologne (region)
German people of Angolan descent
German sportspeople of African descent
German footballers
Footballers from North Rhine-Westphalia
Association football defenders
Bayer 04 Leverkusen II players
Bayer 04 Leverkusen players
SpVgg Greuther Fürth players
VfL Bochum players
Arminia Bielefeld players
FC Erzgebirge Aue players
1. FC Magdeburg players
2. Bundesliga players
Germany youth international footballers
Germany under-21 international footballers